Minoru is a masculine Japanese given name. Notable people with the name include:

, Japanese former president of Nintendo of America
, Japanese actor
, Japanese professional wrestler
, Japanese naval general
, Japanese footballer
, Japanese martial artist
, Japanese astronomer
, Japanese voice actor
, Japanese film director and screenwriter
Minoru Ito (disambiguation), multiple people
Minoru Kawasaki (disambiguation), multiple people
Minoru Kihara (disambiguation), multiple people
Minoru Kimura (born 1993), Brazilian kickboxer
, Japanese handball player
, Japanese professional Go player
, Japanese astronomer
, Japanese footballer
, Japanese footballer
, Japanese musician
, Japanese business executive
, Japanese composer and artistic director
, Japanese ice hockey player
, Japanese martial artist
, Japanese businessman
, Japanese musician
, Japanese baseball player
, Japanese ice hockey player
, an abstract sculptor
, Japanese classical pianist
, Japanese rear admiral
, Japanese solo yachtsman
, Japanese scientist/inventor
, Japanese voice actor
, Japanese professional wrestler and mixed martial artist
, Japanese volleyball player
Minoru Tanaka (disambiguation), multiple people
, Japanese volleyball player and coach
, Japanese football referee
, Japanese comedian
, Japanese ski jumper
, Japanese actor
, Japanese voice actor
, Japanese classical composer
Minoru Yamasaki (1912–1986), American architect who designed the World Trade Center
, Japanese politician
, American lawyer

Fictional characters
Minoru Edajima, from the anime Onegai Teacher
Nico Minoru, from the Marvel Comics series Runaways (comics)
 Minoru “Minnow” Ito, from the novel We Are Not Free by Traci Chee
 Minoru Kohinata, from the manga Karate Shoukoushi Kohinata Minoru by Baba Yasushi
 Minoru, from the Fireworks, Should We See It from the Side or the Bottom?
 Minoru Mineta (峰田 実), from the manga and anime My Hero Academia
 Minoru Minorikawa (御法川 実), from the original 428: Shibuya Scramble

Japanese masculine given names